Anata is a technical death metal band from Varberg, Sweden that formed in 1993.

To date, they have released two demos, four albums and a split album with Bethzaida. In 2005, they completed recordings for an album titled The Conductor's Departure, released in June 2006 on Earache Records/Wicked World Records. Anata have toured Europe with death metal acts such as Dismember, Decapitated, Rotting Christ, and Psycroptic. In 2006 Anata played at Maryland Deathfest, Baltimore, their first United States appearance to date. Anata have also performed at festivals in Europe such as Fuck the Commerce, Neurotic Deathfest, and Gothenburg Deathfest. Anata has remained inactive since Andreas Allenmark left in 2008.

Musical style
Their style employs significant use of dissonance, including contrapuntal structures employing whole- and half-step harmony, as well as dissonant chords. As their music relies greatly on melody and counterpoint, in contrast to most death metal bands who focus more on moving chords and percussive effects (especially complex palm muting patterns), they are sometimes labeled melodic death metal. However, most fans consider this to be an inaccurate characterization, as the term generally refers to a particular style of death metal, namely, the "Gothenburg metal" sound pioneered by bands like In Flames and Dark Tranquillity, rather than simply death metal with a strong melodic element. Anata, though hailing from Sweden (considered the birthplace of melodic death metal), bears little resemblance to these bands; they bear a stronger resemblance to technical death metal pioneers such as Cynic and Atheist, who also employed a great deal of counterpoint (for both bands, the two guitars and bass are rarely playing the same part). However, Anata has little of the jazz fusion influences that Cynic or Atheist had, instead fusing the contrapuntal style with the modern technical death metal style of bands such as Psycroptic and Decapitated.

Discography

Studio albums
 The Infernal Depths of Hatred (CD, Season of Mist, 1998)
 Dreams of Death and Dismay (CD, Season of Mist, 2001)
 Under a Stone With No Inscription (CD, Wicked World, 2004)
 The Conductor's Departure (CD, Wicked World, 2006)

Demos
 Bury Forever the Garden of Lie (Demo, 1995)
 Vast Lands of My Infernal Dominion (Demo, 1997)

Split albums
 WAR Vol. II - Anata vs. Bethzaida (1999, split album with Bethzaida)

Members

Current members 
 Fredrik Schälin − lead vocals, guitar (1993-present)
 Henrik Drake − bass (1996-present)
 Conny Pettersson − drums (2001-present)

Former members 
 Mattias Svensson − guitar (1993–1996)
 Martin Sjöstrand − bass (1993–1996)
 Robert Petersson − drums (1993–2001)
 Andreas Allenmark − guitar, backing vocals (1997–2008)

Timeline

External links 
 Anata official homepage

Swedish technical death metal musical groups
Musical groups established in 1993
Earache Records artists
Season of Mist artists
1993 establishments in Sweden